The Itapanhapima Sustainable Development Reserve is a sustainable development reserve in the state of São Paulo, Brazil.
It protects an area of mangrove forests and supports a traditional extractive population.

Location

The Itapanhapima Sustainable Development Reserve is in the municipality of Cananéia, São Paulo.
It adjoins the Ilha do Tumba Extractive Reserve to the west.
It supports the artisanal fishermen of the area.
The reserve is in the Cananéia lagoon estuary, an important nursery for fish and aquatic mammals.
It contains large mangrove swamps managed by the traditional populations of the reserve and used by some families for extraction of the native oyster and uçá crab.

History

The Itapanhapima Sustainable Development Reserve  was created by state law 12.810 of 21 February 2008.
This law broke up the old Jacupiranga State Park and created the Jacupiranga Mosaic with 14 conservation units.
It is administered by the state forest foundation (Fundação para Conservação e a Produção Florestal do Estado de São Paulo).

Notes

Sources

Sustainable development reserves of Brazil
Protected areas of São Paulo (state)
Protected areas established in 2008
2008 establishments in Brazil